Mansingh Khadka  was the king of Majhakot & Uppalokot until 1559. There was always been a running event called  Liglig Daud annually  where winner of race was chosen as King Of Ligligkot Kingdom. Drabhya Narayan Shah ( Youngest Son Of Yashobrahma) was invited by the Brahmins in particular Bhagirath Panth and Ganesh Pande . On Wednesday the 8th of Bhadon Badi, Saka 1481 (A.D. 1559) Rohini Nakshatra  being an auspicious day, Drabhya Shah and others Bhagirath Panth, Ganesh Pande, Gangaram Rana , Busal, Aryal, Bohra, khanal and Murli Khawas of Ligligkot. Ganesh Pande had collected all the competitors such as the Thapas(bagale), basnet, Malla, kunwars, chand and Maski Rana of the Magar tribe, they went by the Dahya Gauda route and the Durbar. At the same auspicious moment Drabya took his seat on the gaddi and named the newly found kingdom "Gorkha". Later Drabhya Shah used his army to invade neighboring states and his successors continued this aggression to increase the territory belonging to Gorkha By 1570, when Dravya Shah died, the running race was but a lost memory among the people.

References

16th-century monarchs in Asia
Nepalese monarchs
Palpa District
People from Palpa District
16th-century Nepalese people